Sarah Vance may refer to:

 Sarah S. Vance (born 1950), American judge
 Sarah Vance (politician), American politician from Alaska